ISBAT University (ISBAT), whose complete name is International Business, Science And Technology University, is a chartered university in Uganda.

History
The university was established in 2005 as a post-secondary (tertiary) institution of education, that was affiliated with Sikkim Manipal University of India. At that time all courses and academic courses belonged to and were awarded by the Indian university.
 
In 2013 ISBAT began awarding its own degrees and changed its classification to "Other Degree Awarding Institution" (ODAI). In 2015, the university moved to its present campus off of Lugogo Bypass Road. In 2016, ISBAT was elevated to a full university, having met the requirements of the Uganda National Council for Higher Education (UNCHE). On 18 November 2019, the university acquired charter status from the UNCHE.

Overview
As of May 2019, ISBAT University is associated with UCAM University Spain and with Manipal University Dubai. It is a member of the Association of Commonwealth Universities (ACU), the Association to Advance Collegiate School of Business (AACSB), and the International Assembly for Collegiate Business Education (IACBE).

Community social responsibility
In April and May 2019, ISBAT University hosted a neurosurgery, pediatric cardiology and oncology medical camp run by physicians and surgeons from Apollo Hospitals Enterprise Limited from India. The visiting doctors offered free consultations to over 200 patients.

See also
 Education in Uganda
 List of universities in Uganda
 Ugandan university leaders

References

External links 
 Website of ISBAT University

     

 
Kampala Central Division
Educational institutions established in 2005
Universities and colleges in Uganda
2005 establishments in Uganda